Cairine Wilson Secondary School is an Ottawa-Carleton District School Board  high school in Ottawa, Ontario, Canada. It is the main English-language school in the eastern suburb of Orleans. It is located on 975 Orleans Boulevard in the northern edge of the suburb, near the Ottawa River. The school opened in 1975. It was named after Cairine Wilson, Canada's first female Senator.

School performance

Cairine Wilson SS is known for its academic success with roughly 98% of students graduating to higher education (53% being Ontario Scholars).

Courses offered

French Immersion
Outdoor Education
Transportation Technology (Auto-shop)
Foods and Nutrition
Comparative World Religions and Philosophy 
Law and Business 
Fine Arts including Visual Arts, Drama, Integrated theatrical production course, Instrumental music 
Physical Education 
Family studies 
Co-operative Placements
Computer Technology, Media studies, Yearbook 
Integrated cross curricular Character Education program

Sports

Cairine Wilson SS has an athletics program with over 11 sports teams that are regular top contenders in the National Capital Secondary Schools Athletic Association.

Stabbing incident
On Thursday, April 20, 2000 a 15-year-old boy entered the school with a kitchen knife (steak knife) in his backpack, which he brought from home. The boy could not be named due to the Young Offenders Act after being charged with one count of attempted murder, five counts of assault with a weapon and one count of possessing a dangerous weapon.

The incident began with an argument during lunch hour, outside the library on the second floor. The boy threatened a fellow student before finally stabbing him with a knife.  The boy then ran through the school and stabbed another student, while a third student was stabbed by the computer room and two more inside the room. One of the victims was a technician who was stabbed in the back. The principal at the time, Michael Jordan, talked the teenaged boy down and convinced him to give up the knife, but not before attempting to inflict wounds on his own wrists.

The boy was afterwards described as a "loner" and had often been bullied and teased about his appearance.

Notable alumni
 Robert Esche (NHL player, president of the Utica Comets)
 Tom Green (Actor, comedian)
 Rachel Homan (Olympic curler)
 Devon Nichoslon (Olympic wrestler)
 Marc Savard (NHL player)
 Aaron Ward (NHL player, sportscaster)
 Steve Washburn (NHL player)
 Sean Whyte (NHL player)

See also
List of high schools in Ontario

References

External links
School Website
OCDSB Website
2006-2007 OCDSB School Profile
2005-2006 OCDSB School Profile
2004-2005 OCDSB School Profile

High schools in Ottawa
Educational institutions established in 1975
1975 establishments in Ontario